Justice Cooper may refer to:

Charles Cooper (judge) (1795–1887), first chief justice of South Australia
Charles H. Cooper, associate justice of the Montana Supreme Court
Robert E. Cooper Sr., associate justice of the Tennessee Supreme Court
Tim E. Cooper, associate justice of the Supreme Court of Mississippi
William Frierson Cooper, associate justice of the Tennessee Supreme Court

See also
Judge Cooper (disambiguation)